Princess Hedwig of Hesse-Rheinfels-Rotenburg (Hedwig Marie Christine; 26 June 1748 – 27 May 1801) was a German princess and Duchess of Bouillon by marriage. She is sometimes known as Marie Hedwige.

Early life 
Born at the Landgrave's Palace in Rotenburg an der Fulda to Constantine, Hereditary Prince of Hesse-Rotenburg and his wife, Countess Sophia Theresia Hedwigis Eva of Starhemberg (1722-1773), widow of William Hyacinth, Prince of Nassau-Siegen and sister of Georg Adam, Prince of Starhemberg. She was the couple's third child. She had ten other siblings including the future Charles Emmanuel, Landgrave of Hesse-Rotenburg, named after their uncle Charles Emmanuel III of Sardinia.

Biography 
On 17 July 1766 at Carlsburg she married Jacques Léopold de La Tour d'Auvergne, Prince de Turenne and heir to the sovereign Duchy of Bouillon. His parents were Godefroy de La Tour d'Auvergne, Duke of Bouillon, and Princess Louise de Lorraine-Harcourt-Marsan of the House of Guise.

Her husband lived in Navarre prior to the revolution and succeeded his father in 1792. During the collapse of the ancien régime, the duchy of Bouillon was taken from him in 1794 and absorbed into France in October 1795. However, in 1800, he recovered the duchy but was obliged to pay off debts of 3 million livres. The duchy was incorporated in the new Kingdom of the Netherlands in 1815.

The Duchess of Bouillon died childless in Paris on 27 May 1801.

Ancestry

References 

1748 births
1801 deaths
People from Rotenburg an der Fulda
La Tour d'Auvergne
Landgravines of Hesse-Rotenburg
18th-century German people
19th-century German people
Princesses of Turenne
Duchesses of Bouillon
Daughters of monarchs